HMAS Mermaid (A 02) is a Paluma-class survey motor launch serving in the Royal Australian Navy (RAN).

Design and construction

The Paluma-class vessels have a full load displacement of 320 tonnes. Propulsion machinery consists of two General Motors Detroit Diesel 12V-92T engines, which supply  to the two propeller shafts.

The sensor suite of a Paluma-class launch consists of a JRC JMA-3710-6 navigational radar, an ELAC LAZ 72 side-scan mapping sonar, and a Skipper 113 hull-mounted scanning sonar. The vessels are unarmed. The standard ship's company consists of three officers and eleven sailors, although another four personnel can be accommodated. The catamarans were originally painted white, but were repainted naval grey in 2002.

Constructed by Eglo Engineering, Mermaid was laid down on 19 July 1988, launched on 28 September 1989, and commissioned into the RAN on 4 December 1989.

Citations

References

External links

Paluma-class survey motor launches
Survey ships of the Royal Australian Navy
Naval ships of Australia
1989 ships